Edward Celestin Daly, O.P. (October 24, 1894 – November 23, 1964) was an American prelate of the Roman Catholic Church. He served as bishop of the Diocese of Des Moines in Iowa from 1948 until his death in 1964.

Biography

Early life 
Edward Daly was born on October 24, 1894, in Cambridge, Massachusetts, to James and Elizabeth (née Cairns) Daly. He attended Boston College from 1912 to 1914, and made his profession as a member of the Order of Preachers (more commonly known as the Dominicans) in 1915. He studied philosophy and theology at the Dominican House of Studies in Washington, D.C. 

At age 26, Daly was ordained to the priesthood for the Order of Preachers by Bishop John T. McNicholas on June 12, 1921.Daly then studied canon law at the Catholic University of America until 1923, when he became secretary and archivist of the Apostolic Delegation. During this period, he earned a Master of Sacred Theology degree in Rome in 1936 and also served as professor of canon law at the Dominican House of Studies.

Bishop of Des Moines 
On March 13, 1948, Daly was appointed the fourth bishop of the Diocese of Des Moines by Pope Pius XII. He received his episcopal consecration on May 13, 1948, from Archbishop Amleto Cicognani, with Archbishops Henry Rohlman and Leo Binz serving as co-consecrators. He was named an assistant at the pontifical throne in May 1958.

Daly attended the first three sessions of the Second Vatican Council. After attending its third session, Edward Daly died when his plane, TWA Flight 800, crashed shortly after takeoff at Fiumicino Airport near Rome.

References

1894 births
1964 deaths
Boston College alumni
Catholic University of America alumni
People from Cambridge, Massachusetts
American Dominicans
Dominican bishops
20th-century Roman Catholic bishops in the United States
Participants in the Second Vatican Council
Roman Catholic bishops of Des Moines
Accidental deaths in Italy
Victims of aviation accidents or incidents in Italy
Victims of aviation accidents or incidents in 1964
Catholics from Massachusetts